State Highway 146 (SH 146) is a north–south highway in southeastern Texas beginning at I-45 near La Marque and Texas City. It then crosses over the Fred Hartman Bridge over the Houston Ship Channel which carries SH 146 traffic. It then continues north towards Dayton, where it meets US 90 and then heads north and terminates in Livingston at US 59 (Future I-69).

History
SH 146 was designated on March 19, 1930, from SH 6/US 75 northward to Texas City as a renumbering of SH 6A. On July 2, 1932, SH 146 was extended north to Dayton. On August 3, 1932, SH 146 was extended north to Cleveland (the plan was to delete SH 132 when this extension was completed). On September 22, 1932, this extension was canceled, and SH 146 was instead extended north to Livingston, replacing SH 132. On December 16, 1967, SH 146 was relocated east of Liberty. On February 21, 1984, SH 146 was extended south from SH 3 to I-45. On March 28, 1996, SH 146 was relocated in Baytown replacing Loop 201. The old route of SH 146 was redesignated as Business State Highway 146-E.

Spur 201 was designated on December 17, 1941, from SH 146 in Black Duck Bay to Main Street. On September 23, 1959, Spur 201 was redesignated as Loop 201 and was extended to SH 146 at McKinney Road. On October 22, 1976, Loop 201 was extended to SH 146 at Ferry Road. On March 28, 1996, Loop 201 was redesignated as part of SH 146.

Route description
It then heads northwest and interchanging with SH 3. It then passes by Moses Lake and runs by Trinity Bay. Between Bayview and Kemah, it intersects SH 96. The route then interchanges SH 225 before crossing at the Fred Hartman Bridge over the Houston Ship Channel. In Baytown, the highway forms one of its business routes and then interchanges SH 330 before looping east. It then interchanges I-10 before entering Mont Belvieu. After heading north and entering Dayton, SH 146 meets US 90 and runs concurrent with it until reaching Liberty, intersecting SH 321 and Loop 227. It also crosses over the Trinity River before entering Liberty. After separating from US 90, the route heads north, then northeast after intersecting Loop 227, passing by the Trinity River National Wildlife Refuge and then passing through Hardin. It intersects SH 105 in Moss Hill as it proceeds north. The route then passes through Rye and by Ace before reaching Livingston. It intersects US 190 before reaching its northern terminus at US 59 (future Interstate 69 corridor).

Business routes
SH 146 has two business routes.

La Porte Business Spur
Business State Highway 146-D (formerly Loop 410) is a business loop that runs from SH 146 in La Porte to Spur 501. The highway was designated on December 1, 1971 as Loop 410 from SH 146 east, north, and west to SH 146, and was marked as a business route of SH 146. On July 28, 1977, the section from SH 146 via Fairmont Parkway to Spur 501 was cancelled, and Loop 410 was rerouted replacing part of Spur 501 and all of Spur 498. Loop 410 was redesignated as Business State Highway 146-D on June 21, 1990. On March 26, 2009, the section from Spur 501 via Broadway Street north to Main Street and west via Main Street to SH 146 was given to the city of La Porte.

Baytown Business Loop
Business State Highway 146-E is a business loop that runs from SH 146 through Baytown to SH 146. On March 28, 1996, SH 146 was relocated in Baytown replacing Loop 201, and the old route of SH 146 was redesignated as Business State Highway 146-E.

Junction list

References

146
Transportation in Chambers County, Texas
Transportation in Galveston County, Texas
Transportation in Harris County, Texas
Transportation in Liberty County, Texas
Transportation in Polk County, Texas